Pterostichinae is a subfamily of ground beetles (family Carabidae). It belongs to the advanced harpaline assemblage, and if these are circumscribed sensu lato as a single subfamily, Pterostichinae are downranked to a tribe Pterostichini. However, as the former Pterostichitae supertribe of the Harpalinae as loosely circumscribed does seem to constitute a lineage rather distinct from Harpalus, its core group is here considered to be the present subfamily and the Harpalinae are defined more narrowly.

They are usually mid-sized and rather stout ground beetles. Coloration is typically dark and without conspicuous patterns, but often with a strong sheen like polished metal. They are widely distributed and inhabit a wide range of terrestrial habitats. Unlike the more basal ground beetles which only eat small animals, the Pterostichinae include a large proportion of omnivorous or even herbivorous taxa.

Systematics
This group includes the following tribes and genera:

Tribe Chaetodactylini Tschitscherine, 1903
 Chaetodactyla Tschitscherine, 1897

Tribe Cnemalobini Germain, 1911
 Cnemalobus Guerin-Meneville, 1838

Tribe Cratocerini Lacordaire, 1854

 Abacaelostus Straneo, 1952
 Andrewesinulus Straneo, 1938
 Apsidocnemus Alluaud, 1936
 Barylaus Liebherr, 1985
 Brachidius Chaudoir, 1852
 Caecocaelus Straneo, 1949
 Caelostomus W.S.MacLeay, 1825
 Camptogenys Tschitscherine, 1899
 Capabatus Csiki, 1930
 Catapiesis Solier, 1835
 Cratocerus Dejean, 1829
 Crenulostrigus Straneo, 1942
 Cyrtolaus Bates, 1882
 Dactyleurys Tschitscherine, 1899
 Dactylinius Straneo, 1941
 Diachipteryx Alluaud, 1925
 Diceromerus Chaudoir, 1873
 Dromistomus Jeannel, 1948
 Drymonaxus Straneo, 1941
 Feostoma Straneo, 1941
 Hemitelestus Alluaud, 1895
 Homalomorpha Brullé, 1837
 Hoplizomenus Chaudoir, 1873
 Leleuporites Straneo, 1960
 Madapelmus Dajoz, 1985
 Monodryxus Straneo, 1942
 Oxyglychus Straneo, 1938
 Pachycaecus Straneo, 1971
 Pachyroxochus Straneo, 1942
 Platyxythrius Lorenz, 1998
 Stegazopteryx Will, 2004
 Stomonaxellus Tschitscherine, 1901
 Strigomerodes Straneo, 1939
 Strigomerus Chaudoir, 1873
 Trichillinus Straneo, 1938

Tribe Microcheilini Jeannel, 1948
 Microcheila Brulle, 1834

Tribe Morionini Brulle, 1835

 Buderes Murray, 1857
 Hyperectenus Alluaud, 1935
 Hyperion Castelnau, 1834
 Megamorio Chaudoir, 1880
 Morion Latreille, 1810
 Morionidius Chaudoir, 1880
 Moriosomus Motschulsky, 1864
 Platynodes Westwood, 1846
 Stereostoma Murray, 1857

Tribe Pterostichini Bonelli, 1810
 (See Pterostichini for ~180 genera)

Tribe Zabrini Bonelli, 1810
 (See Zabrini for 3 genera)

References

 
Carabidae subfamilies
Taxa named by Franco Andrea Bonelli